The boys' Optimist competition at the 2006 Asian Games in Doha was held from 5 to 12 December 2006.

Schedule
All times are Arabia Standard Time (UTC+03:00)

Results
Legend
DNF — Did not finish
DSQ — Disqualification
OCS — On course side

References

External links
Official website

Men's Optimist